Ambalatany is a town and commune in Madagascar. It belongs to the district of Farafangana, which is a part of Atsimo-Atsinanana Region. The population of the commune was estimated to be approximately 16,000 in 2001 commune census.

Primary and junior level secondary education are available in town. The majority (99.9%) of the population of the commune are farmers.  The most important crops are rice and bananas; with coffee as another important agricultural product. Services provide employment for 0.1% of the population.

References and notes 

Populated places in Atsimo-Atsinanana